Perisyntrocha alienalis is a moth in the family Crambidae. It is found in Indonesia (Sulawesi) and New Guinea.

References

Spilomelinae
Moths described in 1866